Daysam Ben Nasr (born 31 March 1998), is a French footballer of Tunisian descent, who currently plays as a midfielder for Lavagnese.

Club career
Born in Vichy, France, Ben Nasr started his career with local side Sporting Club Amical Cussétois, before joining the youth academy of RC Vichy. From there, he joined a Pôle Espoir in Vichy, organised by the French Football Federation. He would go on to spend two years at AS Moulins, before joining Cournon-d'Auvergne and then Clermont Foot.

Following his release by Clermont Foot, Ben Nasr dropped down to the Championnat National 3 with Montluçon. After two seasons with the Montluçon-based side, he reportedly returned to the country of his heritage, Tunisia, for personal reasons. However, to the surprise of his coach at Montluçon, Mickaël Bessaque, Ben Nasr had signed a five-year deal with Tunisian Ligue Professionnelle 1 side Stade Tunisien.

After Stade Tunisien's relegation to the Tunisian Ligue Professionnelle 2 in 2021, Ben Nasr returned to Europe to sign for Italian Serie D side Casale. However, he would leave for fellow Serie D side Lavagnese in December of the same year.

Career statistics

Club

Notes

References

1998 births
Living people
People from Vichy
French footballers
French sportspeople of Tunisian descent
Association football midfielders
Championnat National 3 players
Tunisian Ligue Professionnelle 1 players
Serie D players
RC Vichy players
AS Moulins players
Clermont Foot players
Montluçon Football players
Stade Tunisien players
Casale F.B.C. players
U.S.D. Lavagnese 1919 players
French expatriate footballers
French expatriate sportspeople in Italy
Expatriate footballers in Italy
Sportspeople from Allier
Footballers from Auvergne-Rhône-Alpes